Hittinger is a surname. Notable people with the surname include:

Charles Hittinger, American actor
Chuck Hittinger (born 1983), American actor
F. Russell Hittinger (born 1949), the Warren Chair of Catholic Studies and Research Professor of Law at the University of Tulsa.
Matthew Hittinger (born 1978), American poet and writer